Ilyas Merkes (born January 8, 1987, in Al-Hasakah) is a retired Syrian footballer and currently coach. He is currently the assistant manager of Assyriska FF.

Notes

External links
 Career stats at Kooora.com (Arabic)
 Career stats at goalzz.com
 Stats at persianleague.com
 Ilyas Merkes at Arameiska-Syrianska Botkyrka

1987 births
Living people
People from Al-Hasakah
Allsvenskan players
Superettan players
Syrian footballers
Syrian expatriate footballers
Syria international footballers
Expatriate footballers in Iran
Syrian expatriate sportspeople in Iran
Syrian emigrants to Sweden
Syrianska IF Kerburan players
Association football defenders
Assyrian/Syriac Syrians
Assyrian footballers
Syrian Premier League players